Zhu Zhi (24 March 1377 – 4 June 1424), the Prince of Wei (衛王; 1378–1392), later the Prince of Liao, was the 15th son of the Hongwu Emperor and Consort Han. He was ancestor of the last Ming prince to refuse to capitulate to the Qing, Zhu Shugui, Prince of Ningjing. Zhu Zhi's heirs used the generation names "Gui, Hao, En, Chong, Zhi, Yun, Reng, Qi, Bao, He, Xian, Shu, Yan, Zun, Ru, Cai, Han, Li, Long, Yu".

Family 
Consorts and Issue:
 Princess consort of Liao, of the Guo clan (遼王妃 郭氏) (created 1394), daughter of Guo Ying (郭英)
 Lady, of the  Ding clan (丁氏) 
 Prince Su of Liao (遼肅王; 1399–1471), fourth son
 Lady, of the Lu clan (呂氏)
 Zhu Guichang, Prince Anxi of Xiangyin (湘陰安僖王 朱貴焻; 1413–1467), tenth son
 Zhu Guixi, Prince Jinghe of Qishui (蘄水靖和王 朱貴熡; 1424–1468), twentieth son
 Lady, of the Xie clan (謝氏)
 Zhu Guishu, Prince Zhuanghe of Hengyang (衡陽莊和王 朱貴㷂; 1414–1457), twelfth son
 Zhu Guiyu, Prince Gongxiang  of Yuanling (沅陵恭憲王 朱貴燏; 1415–1372), seventeenth
 Zhu Guiyu, Prince Daoxi of Mayang (麻陽悼僖王 朱貴燠; 1417–1442), eighteenth son
 Zhu Guichan, Prince Gonghui of Hengshan (衡山恭惠王 朱貴煘; 1421–1476), Prince Gonghui of Hengshan, nineteenth son
 Lady, of the Xue clan (薛氏)
 Zhu Guifu, Prince Anxi of Yiyang (益陽安僖王 朱貴烰, 1412–1448), ninth son
 Lady, of the Zhao clan (趙氏)
 Zhu Guinie, Prince Daogong of Yingshan (應山悼恭王 朱貴㸎; 1414–1446), fourteenth son
 Lady, of the Song clan (宋氏)
 Zhu Guiyi, Prince Zhuanghui of Zhijiang (枝江莊惠王 朱貴熠; 1415–1453), sixteenth son
 Lady, of the Zhang clan (張氏)
 Zhu Guiheng, Prince Anhui of Songzi (松滋安惠王 朱貴烆; 1404–1442), eighth son
 Unknown
 Zhu Guiying (朱貴煐; 25 July 1397–1424), first son
 Zhu Guixia (朱貴烚; 29 December 1397–1449), second son
 Zhu Guixie, Prince of Yuanan (遠安王 朱貴燮; 1399–1466), third son
 Zhu Guixuan (朱貴煐; 1400–1452), fifth son
 Zhu Guidun, Prince of Qiangjiang (潛江王 朱貴炖; 1401–1407), sixth son
 Zhu Guiling, Prince of Yidu (宜都王 朱貴燯;1 403–1406), seventh son
 Eleventh son
 Thirteenth son
 Zhu Guijie, Prince Kangjian of Yicheng (宜城康簡王朱 朱貴㸅; 1414–1474), fifteenth son
Princess Jiangling (江陵郡主), first daughter
Princess Jianghua (江華郡主), ninth daughter
Princess Luxi (瀘溪郡主), tenth daughter
Princess Zhushan (竹山郡主), eleventh daughter
Princess Suining (綏寧郡主), twelfth daughter
Princess Guidong (桂東郡主), thirteenth daughter
(Thirteen daughters)

References 

Ming dynasty imperial princes
1377 births
1424 deaths
Sons of emperors